Jibin George Sebastian is an Indian music composer, lyricist and entrepreneur from Kochi, Kerala who predominantly work in Malayalam Movie Industry. He is the first Indian from Kerala to directly debut in Hollywood as the music composer of the song Sometimes I Can't Relate from the movie Unbridled. He entered into the movie industry through the English movie Unbridled starring oscar nominee Eric Roberts, T.C. Stallings, Jenn Gotzon, Dey Young etc. Later in 2019, he composed and written lyrics for the songs Parayu Engu Nee and Pranayan En Kanavil for the movie Rakshapurushan starring Deepak Menon. The songs were sung by Vijay Yesudas and Najim Arshad and Zee Music acquired the rights for the songs. He is also known for releasing multilingual album named Beat of Indian Youth for which former Indian President A P J Abdul Kalam has written lyrics. The album got Limca Book of Records in 2015 and he was awarded first price in the Fame Music Awards organized by SAE Institute through an All Indian contest for the Tamil track Vaa Vaa Jaikalam he composed for the album Beat of Indian Youth. He has recently composed and written lyrics for a music album named Poradidam sung by Najim Arshad and Juta Hausla sung by Bollywood singer Alamgir themed to fight against Covid Pandemic  His upcoming movie Elza has around 25 songs sung by singers including Vineeth Sreenivasan, Najim Arshad, Nithya Mammen etc. His life story was a subject for a TedX Talk

Discography

Albums

Movie Songs

Filmography

Awards and recognition

References

External links
 
 
 
 

Living people
Indian male composers
Musicians from Kochi
Film musicians from Kerala
Malayalam-language lyricists
Indian male songwriters
Year of birth missing (living people)